Christiaan Robbert Steven Soumokil (13 October 1905 – 12 April 1966) was a South Moluccan politician and prosecutor who served as the second president of the Republic of South Maluku from 1950 until his execution in 1966 by Indonesian forces loyal to Suharto.

Early life 
His father was Moluccan and his mother was an Indo, meaning of mixed Dutch and indigenous Indonesian descent. After high school, he studied law at the University of Leiden before returning to Indonesia in 1935 and finding work as a law official in Java.

Political career 
Between May 1947 and February 1950, he served as Minister of Justice in four cabinets of the State of East Indonesia.

In April 1950, Soumokil, Johanis Manuhutu, and Albert Wairisal signed a declaration proclaiming the independence of the South Moluccas from the United States of Indonesia and the founding of an independent Republic of South Maluku. He became its second president on 3 May, a week after its creation.

Exile and execution 
After the Indonesian invasion of Ambon and its successful attack on the rebel capital of Ambon, Soumokil fled to the nearby island of Seram, where he led a small band of guerillas until his capture on 2 December 1963. He was initially imprisoned on Java.

Soumokil was executed by firing squad on 12 April 1966, on Pulau Ubi Basar by forces loyal to Suharto.

See also 
 Maluku sectarian conflict

References

Footnotes

Bibliography 
 
 
 
 

20th-century executions by Indonesia
1905 births
1966 deaths
Executed presidents
Indo people
Indonesian political prisoners
Moluccan independence activists
Moluccan people
Leiden University alumni
People from Surabaya
Presidents of the Republic of South Maluku